The Ard Scoil na nDéise is an all-girl's secondary school in Dungarvan, County Waterford, Republic of Ireland.

History
The school was established in 1990 as an amalgamation of Coláiste Muire, run by the Sisters of Mercy, and St. Joseph's Secondary School, run by the Presentation Sisters.

In 2007, the school began operating under the trusteeship of CEIST Catholic Education an Irish Schools Trust.

Academics
The Core Curriculum includes Gaeilge, English, Mathematics, Science, German or French, History, Geography, and Civic, Social & Political Education. The school offers a broad curriculum and a range of extracurricular activities. The school provides the Junior Certificate, an optional Transition Year (TY) programme, the Leaving Certificate Vocational Programme (LCVP) and the established Leaving Certificate.

Extracurricular 

The school also has a student council. The Cáirde team is a student-mentoring initiative, which assists with the transition of incoming students. The group is made up of fifth and sixth year students who volunteer to help first years settle in as they start secondary school.

References

External links 
Ard Scoil na nDéise website.

Secondary schools in County Waterford
Educational institutions established in 1990
Girls' schools in the Republic of Ireland
1990 establishments in Ireland